Ernesto Díaz (13 September 1952 – 4 May 2002) was a Colombian former footballer who competed in the 1972 Summer Olympics.

References

1954 births
2002 deaths
Association football midfielders
Colombian footballers
Colombia international footballers
Olympic footballers of Colombia
Footballers at the 1972 Summer Olympics
1975 Copa América players
Categoría Primera A players
Independiente Santa Fe footballers
20th-century Colombian people